The Grants Pass Supervisor's Warehouse is a historic former national forest administrative facility in Grants Pass, Oregon, United States.

The warehouse complex was listed on the National Register of Historic Places in 1991.

See also
National Register of Historic Places listings in Josephine County, Oregon

References

External links

Park buildings and structures on the National Register of Historic Places in Oregon
Government buildings completed in 1933
Buildings and structures in Grants Pass, Oregon
National Register of Historic Places in Josephine County, Oregon
1933 establishments in Oregon